Located in Billerica, Massachusetts The Middlesex Jail and House of Correction serves Middlesex County, Massachusetts.  Men are housed here awaiting trial or serving sentences up to 2 ½ years. The jail also houses women classified to the Middlesex Sheriff's pre-release center

History 

Originally built on a 350-acre farm in Billerica, Massachusetts, the facility was to replace a condemned jail 15 miles away in East Cambridge, Massachusetts. The facility originally could hold over 300 prisoners, cost $837,000 to build, and was completed in December 1931.

External links 

 https://www.middlesexsheriff.org/middlesex-jail-house-correction

Jails in Massachusetts